Man of the Match is a 2022 Indian Kannada-language satire black comedy written and directed by D. Satya Prakash. Movie produced under PRK Productions banner. The film stars Nataraj S. Bhat, Dharmanna Kadooru, Atharva Prakash, Mayuri Nataraj, Shridatta, Brunda vikram. Satya Prakash uses a film-within-a-film narrative where the main actors play fictionalised versions of themselves. Nataraj decides to produce a film, after frustrated with his acting career not taking off anywhere, with his actor friend Dharmanna. The day of auditions in a huge studio provides more drama and surprises than expected, as Nataraj has something different on his mind.

Cast
 Nataraj S. Bhat as himself, director of the film
 Dharmanna Kadooru as himself, producer of the film
 Sunder as himself
 Veena Sunder as herself
 Vasuki Vaibhav as himself, Cameo appearance 
 Manjunath D as Swamy, supporting actor
 Atharva Prakash as cutout Hero
 Mayuri Nataraj
 Brunda Vikram as Bhavana, Bhushan fiancee 
 Sridatta as Bhushan as Software Engineer 
 Sridhar Ram as Shridhar
 Santosh Hasan
 Chandrashekar Madhabhavi as Assistant director Gandhi
 BS Kempraju as himself, Editor

Production
D. Satya Prakash wanted to direct a film for Puneeth Rajkumar in a lead but busy schedule of latter's, director decides to make another film with PRK Productions. Director Satya Prakash wrote a story decade ago but unable to picturisation. During first lockdown share online story with Puneeth Rajkumar, who agreed to produce the film. Entire film shoot in Kanteerava Studios.

Satya Prakash cast Nataraj S Bhat and Dharmanna Kadur as themselves in the roles of a director and a producer respectively. Director worked with them in his debut film. Newcomer Atharva Prakash joined main cast, initially selected for extra role in movie.

Soundtrack 

Vasuki Vaibhav working with D. Satya Prakash 4th time as music director. Puneeth Rajkumar sung the song in the film.

Release
Movie released on 5 May 2022 in Amazon Prime Video.

References

External links 

Indian comedy-drama films
Amazon Prime Video original films
Indian black comedy films
Indian direct-to-video films
2022 films
2022 comedy films
2020s Kannada-language films